The European qualifying competition for the 2024 FIFA Futsal World Cup will be a men's futsal competition that will determine the seven UEFA teams in the 2024 FIFA Futsal World Cup.

If a European association is designated to host the 2024 FIFA Futsal World Cup, only six teams can enter in addition to the host, which qualifies automatically.

Format
The qualifying competition consists of five stages:
Preliminary round: The lowest-ranked 24 teams play in the preliminary round, and are drawn into six groups of four teams. The winners and runners-up of each group advance to the main round to join the 24 highest-ranked teams which receive byes to the main round.
Main round: The 36 teams are drawn into twelve groups of three. The 12 winners and four best runners-up progress directly to the elite round. The remaining eight runners-up enter main round play-offs.
Main round play-offs: The eight teams are drawn into four ties, to be played home and away. The four winners of the ties complete the elite round line-up.
Elite round: The 20 teams are drawn into five groups of four. The winners of each group qualify directly for the World Cup, while the four best runners-up advance to the play-offs. If a European association is selected to host the finals, only the two best runners-up will enter the elite round play-offs.
Elite round play-offs: The four teams are drawn into two ties to play home-and-away two-legged matches to determine the last two European qualified teams. If only two teams enter, a draw will be held to determine the order of matches.

In the preliminary round each group is played as a round-robin mini-tournament at the pre-selected hosts.

In the main and the elite round, each team plays one home and one away match against each other team in its group.

Tiebreakers
In the preliminary round teams are ranked according to points (3 points for a win, 1 point for a draw, 0 points for a loss), and if tied on points, the following tiebreaking criteria are applied, in the order given, to determine the rankings (Regulations Articles 15.01 and 15.02):
Points in head-to-head matches among tied teams;
Goal difference in head-to-head matches among tied teams;
Goals scored in head-to-head matches among tied teams;
If more than two teams are tied, and after applying all head-to-head criteria above, a subset of teams are still tied, all head-to-head criteria above are reapplied exclusively to this subset of teams;
Goal difference in all group matches;
Goals scored in all group matches;
Penalty shoot-out if only two teams have the same number of points, and they met in the last round of the group and are tied after applying all criteria above (not used if more than two teams have the same number of points, or if their rankings are not relevant for qualification for the next stage);
Disciplinary points (red card = 3 points, yellow card = 1 point, expulsion for two yellow cards in one match = 3 points);
UEFA coefficient;

In the main and the elite round, teams are ranked according to points (3 points for a win, 1 point for a draw, 0 points for a loss), and if tied on points, the following tiebreaking criteria are applied, in the order given, to determine the rankings (Regulations Articles 15.01 and 15.02):
Points in head-to-head matches among tied teams;
Goal difference in head-to-head matches among tied teams;
Goals scored in head-to-head matches among tied teams;
If more than two teams are tied, and after applying all head-to-head criteria above, a subset of teams are still tied, all head-to-head criteria above are reapplied exclusively to this subset of teams;
Goal difference in all group matches;
Goals scored in all group matches;
Penalty shoot-out if only two teams have the same number of points, and they met in the last round of the group and are tied after applying all criteria above (not used if more than two teams have the same number of points, or if their rankings are not relevant for qualification for the next stage);
Away goals scored in all group matches;
Wins in all group matches;
Away wins in all group matches;
Disciplinary points (red card = 3 points, yellow card = 1 point, expulsion for two yellow cards in one match = 3 points);
UEFA coefficient used for the group phase draw;

In the play-offs, the team that scores more goals on aggregate over the two legs qualifies for the final tournament. As there is no away goals rule, if the aggregate score is level, an extra time of two 5-minute periods is played. If both teams score the same number of goals or no goals are scored during extra time, the tie is decided by penalty shoot-out (Regulations Article 16.01).

Teams
The 48 teams were seeded according to the coefficient ranking. Seeded teams were determined based in November 2021 UEFA coefficient (shown in brackets). Six teams were pre-selected as hosts for the preliminary round. The draw for the preliminary round was held on 7 December 2021.

Schedule
The qualifying matches are played on dates that fall within the FIFA Futsal International Match Calendar.

Preliminary round
The winners and runners-up of each group advanced to the main round to join the 24 teams which receive byes. The preliminary round was scheduled to be played between 5–12 April 2022.

Times are CEST (UTC+2), as listed by UEFA (local times, if different, are in parentheses).

Group A

Group B

Group C

Group D

Group E

Group F

Main round
The winners and four best runners-up will advance to the elite round. The remaining eight runners-up enter main round play-offs. The matches of the main round must be completed by 8 March 2023. The draw for the main round was held on 7 July 2022.

Teams that received a bye to this round

Teams qualified from the preliminary round

Times are CEST (UTC+2) and CET (UTC+1), as listed by UEFA (local times, if different, are in parentheses).

Group 1

Group 2

Group 3

Group 4

Group 5

Group 6

Group 7

Group 8

Group 9

Group 10

Group 11

Group 12

Ranking of second-placed teams

Main round play-offs 
The winner of each tie will advance to the Elite round. The matches will be played on 10–19 April 2023.

The draw for the main round play-offs was held on 10 March 2023. 

|}

Elite round
The five group winners will advance to the Futsal World Cup. The four best runners-up enter the elite round play-offs. If a European association is selected to host the finals, only the two best runners-up will enter the elite round play-offs.

Teams qualified from the main round

Times are CEST (UTC+2) and CET (UTC+1), as listed by UEFA (local times, if different, are in parentheses).

Group A

Group B

Group C

Group D

Group E

Ranking of second-placed teams

Elite round play-offs
The draw for the elite round play-offs will be held on 25 January 2024. The matches will be played on 8–17 April 2024.

The winner of each tie will advance to the Futsal World Cup.

If a European association is selected to host the finals, only the two best runners-up will enter the elite round play-offs and there will be only one tie.

|}

Qualified teams for FIFA Futsal World Cup

The following seven teams from UEFA qualified for the 2024 FIFA Futsal World Cup.

1 Bold indicates champions for that year. Italic indicates hosts for that year.

Top goalscorers
Preliminary round: 
Main round: 
Main round play-offs:  

Total: 

Players in bold are still in the competition

Notes

References

External links

Futsal World Cup Matches: 2024 Qualifying, UEFA.com

2024
qualification
qualification
Sports events affected by the 2022 Russian invasion of Ukraine